is a Japanese voice actress.

Filmography

Television animation
1970s
Wakakusa no Charlotte

1980s
Birth
Dragon Ball (1986) (Old Woman (episode 4), Sno's Mother)
Golden Warrior Gold Lightan
Lady!!

1990s
The Wonderful Galaxy of Oz
Yaiba

2000s
Dennō Coil

2010s
JoJo's Bizarre Adventure: Stardust Crusaders (2014) (Enya)
Rin-ne (2016) (Tama)

unknown date
GeGeGe no Kitarō

Theatrical animation
Dragon Ball: The Legend of Shenlong (1986) (Pansy's Mother)
Kukuriraige -Sanxingdui Fantasy- (Cancelled)

Video games
God of War (2005) (Narrator)
God of War II (2007) (Gaia, Narrator)
God of War III (2010) (Gaia, Narrator)
JoJo's Bizarre Adventure: Eyes of Heaven (2015) (Enya)
Senran Kagura: Estival Versus (2015) (Sayuri)
Gundam Breaker 3 (2016) (Irato granny)

Tokusatsu
Tokusou Sentai Dekaranger (Shinnooian Hakutaku (ep. 25, 34, 49))
Ressha Sentai ToQger (Marchioness Morc (eps. 27 - 47), Kuliner Announce (eps. 11 - 12, 27))
Ressha Sentai ToQger vs. Kyoryuger: The Movie (Marchioness Morc)
Ressha Sentai ToQger Returns: Super ToQ 7gou of Dreams (Marchioness Morc)

Dubbing
The Elder Scrolls V: Skyrim, Elenwen, Boethiah (Jean Gilpin)
The Mule, Mary (Dianne Wiest)
Nancy Drew and the Hidden Staircase, Flora (Linda Lavin)
The NeverEnding Story, Urgl (Patricia Hayes)
A Series of Unfortunate Events, The Woman with Hair but No Beard (Beth Grant)
Young Adult, Jan (Mary Beth Hurt)

References

External links
 Reiko Suzuki profile at Arts Vision
 
 

1944 births
Living people
Japanese video game actresses
Japanese voice actresses
Voice actresses from Tokyo
20th-century Japanese actresses
21st-century Japanese actresses